Song Jin-woo (Korean: 송진우, hanja: 宋鎭禹, May 8, 1889 - December 30, 1945) was a Korean journalist, politician, independence activist, and social activist. His nickname was Goha (고하, 古下). He was the 3rd, 6th and 8th CEO of The Dong-a Ilbo and he was the founder and first head of the Korea Democratic Party (한국 민주당) in 1945. He was killed by Han Hyun-woo, a member of Baikuisa, a South Korean terrorist group.

See also 
 Kim Seong-su
 Kim Gu
 The Dong-a Ilbo
 Korea Democratic Party
 Yun Bo-seon
 Shin Ik-hee
 Chang Deok-soo

Notes

External links
 goha SongJinwoo Museum
 Song Jin-woo:Daum 
 Song Jin-woo:Nate korean history 
 Song Jin-woo 

1889 births
1945 deaths
Korean politicians
Korean journalists
Korean independence activists
Assassinated Korean politicians
Assassinated South Korean people
People murdered in Korea
Korean revolutionaries
South Korean anti-communists
Korean educators
People imprisoned on charges of terrorism
20th-century journalists